Digges is a surname. Notable people with the surname include:

 Deborah Digges (1950–2009), American poet and teacher
 Dudley Digges (c. 1583–1639), 17th century British MP
 Dudley Digges (actor) (1879–1947)
 Edward Digges (1620–1674), Colonial Governor of Virginia
 Jeremiah Digges, pen name of Josef Berger (speechwriter)
 Leonard Digges (scientist) (1520–1559), mathematician and surveyor
 Leonard Digges (writer) (1588–1635), poet and translator
 Robert Digges Wimberly Connor (1878–1950), American historian and the first Archivist of the United States
 Thomas Digges (1546–1595), English mathematician and astronomer
 Walter M. Digges (1877–1934), lawyer, judge and state delegate from Maryland, United States
 West Digges (1720–1786), English actor